Damthang is a small town in the South Sikkim district of the Indian state of Sikkim.

Geography
It has an average elevation of 1,852 metres (6,076 feet).

References

Cities and towns in Namchi district